Fasih Bari Khan() also spelled as Faseeh Bari Khan is a television scriptwriter from Pakistan. He was born in Karachi, Pakistan. Khan is generally known for the bold portrayals of social issues in his writings. He also wrote Lollywood films also and best known for 7 Din Mohabbat In (2018). In Pakistan television industry he is highly acclaimed for his blockbuster drama Quddusi Sahab Ki Bewah.

Career
Khan has written several highly acclaimed yet controversial TV plays for different networks. He first rose to fame with the acclaimed Burns Road Ki Nilofer. He is best known for Quddusi Sahab Ki Bewah which ran for 140 episodes His stories are reflective of every day lives of the inner cities of Pakistan and highlight ills of society that are often viewed as controversial. His plays come across as a slice of life, offered up without the garnishing of pretence. His plays are mostly directed by Mazhar Moin, his childhood friend.

In late 2021, Khan will made his directional debut with short film Dafa Ho Jao Tum starring Resham and Abdullah Ejaz with the support of hamza safdar a 19 years old boy.

Work

Films
7 Din Mohabbat In
Jeewan Hathi

Drama serials
 Khala Kulsum Ka Kumba
Behkawa
 Quddusi Sahab Ki Bewah
Mohabbat Jaye Bhar Mein
 Taar-e-Ankaboot
 Mithu Aur Aapa
Kitna Satatay Ho
 Googly Mohalla
Khatoon Manzil
 Faltu Larki
 Mohini Mansion Ki Cinderellayain
 Ghisi Piti Mohabbat

Telefilms
Shakoor Sahab 
Saray Ghat Ki Farzana
Bawli Bitiya
Pichaal Periyan
Ronak Jahan Ka Nafsiyati Gharaana
Burns Road Ki Niloufer
 Bhopal Wali Bilquees
Khalid Ki Khalda
Pichaal Pariyaan
Aik Aur Seeta

Web series
 Chintoo Ki Mummy
 Chintoo ki mummy 2
 Chintoo ki mummy 3

References

Living people
Pakistani dramatists and playwrights
Year of birth missing (living people)